Shri Swami Samarth (Marathi: श्री स्वामी समर्थ) also known as Swami of Akkalkot was an Indian spiritual master of the Dattatreya Tradition. He is a widely known spiritual figure in various Indian states including Maharashtra and Karnataka. He lived during the nineteenth century.

Shri Swami Samarth traveled all across the Indian subcontinent and eventually set his abode at Akkalkot, a village in present-day Maharashtra. He is thought to have initially arrived at Akkalkot on a Wednesday, during either September or October in 1856. He resided at Akkalkot for close to 22 years.

His parentage and origins remain obscure. According to legend, once when a disciple asked Swami a question about his birth, Swami responded that he had originated from a banyan tree (vata-vriksha in Marathi). On another occasion, Swami had said that his earlier name was Nrusimha Bhan.
Swami Samarth Maharaj foundation at Dindori & Akkalkot

Legend

Shri Swami Samarth is widely considered to be the fourth (third in physical form) incarnation of Dattatreya, the Lord Almighty. He is also believed to be a reincarnation of Narasimha Saraswati, another earlier spiritual master of the Dattatreya sect.

Life
According to Shri Swami Samarth himself, he had originally appeared in the Kardali forests near Srisailam, a Hindu holy town in present-day Andhra Pradesh. He might have moved through Tibet and Nepal during his travels across the Himalayas and its adjacent regions. He is also believed to have visited various Indian regions such as Puri, Varanasi (also Kashi), Haridwar, Girnar, Kathiawar and Rameswaram. He might have also briefly lived at Mangalvedha, a town near Pandharpur in present-day Solapur district, Maharashtra. He finally settled at Akkalkot.

Shri Swami Samarth is also believed to have visited Maniknagar, Karnataka to meet Manik Prabhu, an Indian saint and mystic considered to be another incarnation of Dattatreya. According to the Shree Manik Prabhu Charitra (biography), Swami resided at Maniknagar for around six months. During this period, Manik Prabhu and Swami Samarth often sat under a cluster fig tree (Audumbar in Marathi) and had conversations on profound spirituality. It is claimed that Swami Samarth regarded Manik Prabhu as a brother.

Shri Swami Samarth probably arrived at Akkalkot in 1856 on receiving an invitation from Chintopant Tol and then stayed on the outskirts of the town for about 22 years. He usually lived at the residence of his disciple Cholappa, where his shrine is presently located.

A common mantra commemorating Shri Swami Samarth is read as “Aum Abhayadata Shree Swamisamarthaya Namaha”. His biography known as Shree Guruleelamrut was authored by Sant Wamanbhau Maharaj.

See also
 Akkalkot
 Dindori
 Gogaon, Akkalkot

Sources
The Supreme Master (Swami Samartha's Comprehensive Biography).
Shri Dattatreya Dnyankosh by Dr. P. N. Joshi (Shri Dattateya Dnyankosh Prakashan, Pune, 2000).
"Shri Swami Samarth Nityakram aani Upasana"(in Marathi) by Dr. N.S. Kunte (Shri Vatvruksh Swami Samarth Maharaj Devsthan, Akkalkot, 2000).
Datta-Sampradyacha Itihas (History of Datta Sampradaya) by Dr. R. C. Dhere (Padmagnadha Prakashan, Pune).
Shri GuruCharitra (Sri Gurucharitra) (new, abbreviated version)
Shri Akkalkotniwasi Swami Maharaj yanche Charitra by G. V. Mulekar
Shri Akkalkot Swami Maharaj Charitra by R. S. Sahasrabuddhe
"Pesum Deivam" - Akkalkot Maharaj Arulaatchi - Tamil Version by"Swamy Suthan" Dr.J.S.Sayikumar +91 86085 06816

Additional publications

 Hanumante, Mukund M. (1999, 2000). A Glimpse of Divinity: Shri Swami Samarth Maharaj of Akkalkot, 
 Kulkarni, Shriram A. (2001). Shri Swami Samarth Maharaj of Akkalkot: Ashttotarshat Namavali: Vicharmanthan Sar (Marathi)
 Kulkarni, Shriram A. (2000). Shri Swami Samarth Maharaj of Akkalkot: Bhagwat Chaitanyache Shalaka Darshan(Marathi)
 Oza, Kaushik (2007). Shri Swami Samarth Maharaj of Akkalkot: Bhagwat Chaitanyache Shalaka Darshan (Gujrati)
 Patil,Rajgouda (2012) Shri Swami Samarth Maharaj of Akkalkot: Bhagwat Chaitanyada Kshana Darshan (Kannada)
 Patil,Rajgouda (2017) "Amrutada Anjali": Shri Swami Samarth Maharajar sanketi vakyagal vivrane (Kannada)
 Patil,Rajgouda (2021) "Sakh Nirantar": Shri Swami Samarth Maharajar, Akkalkot (Kannada)
 Kulkarni, Shriram A. "Amrutachi Wonzali" (Marathi)
 Joshi, Vasant G. (2006). Sulabh Shri Dnyaneshwari(Marathi) (Financial Sponsorship)
 Kulkarni, Shriram A. (2007). Sarth Shrimat Gurucharitra: Sulabh Marathi Bhavarthasaha(Financial Sponsorship)
 Shri Gurucharitra, 14th Chapter in English & Marathi, 2009.
 Swami Tava Charanam Sharanam, Audio CD of Melodious Divine Songs, 2009.
 Hanumante, Mukund M. (2010). Eternal Friend: Shri Swami Samarth Maharaj of Akkalkot
 Ekkirala Bharadwaja
 Kaliyugi Shri Swami Samarth Charitra Tatva Rahasya (Marathi Granth)
 A short biography of Akkalkot Niwasi Shree Swami Samarth Maharaj by Shree Vitthalrao Joshi Charities Trust

References

19th-century Hindu religious leaders
1878 deaths
People from Solapur district
Year of birth missing